Prema may refer to:

Films:
Prema (1952 film), a Telugu film
Prema (1989 film), a Telugu film starring Venkatesh and Revathi
Prema (2002 film), a 2002 Kannada film
Tholi Prema (1998 film), a 1998 Telugu film starring Pawan Kalyan and Keerthi Reddy

People:

Prema (Kannada actress), actress in the Kannada film industry
Prema (Malayalam actress) (fl. 1954–1981), Malayalam film actress, mother of Shobha
Prema (musician), British recording artist

Other uses:

Premavision and its subsidiary Prema Toy Company, founded by Gumby and Pokey cartoonist Art Clokey
Prema Arts Centre, Uley, Gloucestershire, England
Prem (Hinduism), a concept of elevated love
Prema Powerteam, a motorsport team from Italy

See also
List of tropical cyclones named Prema, a name used for two tropical cyclones in the South Pacific Ocean
Prem (disambiguation)
Premabhishekam (disambiguation)